Sairul Amar bin Ayob (born 10 September 1980) is a former male badminton player from Malaysia and coach. He won the 2005 New Zealand Open after winning against Chan Yan Kit.

Achievements

BWF Grand Prix (2 titles, 1 runner-up) 
The BWF Grand Prix had two levels, the BWF Grand Prix and Grand Prix Gold. It was a series of badminton tournaments sanctioned by the Badminton World Federation (BWF) which was held from 2007 to 2017.

Men's singles

 IBF World Grand Prix tournament
 Grand Prix Tournament

References

1980 births
Living people
People from Perlis
Malaysian people of Malay descent
Malaysian Muslims
Malaysian male badminton players